The  is the 2nd edition of the Japan Film Professional Awards. It awarded the best of 1992 in film. The ceremony took place on March 27, 1993, at Cinema Argo Shinjuku in Tokyo.

Awards 
Best Film: Hikinige Family
Best Director: Hideyuki Hirayama (The Games Teachers Play)
Best Actress: Tomomi Nishimura (Baku)
Best Actor: Shirō Sano (Kurenai Monogatari)
Best New Director: Tadafumi Tomioka (Wangan Bad Boy Blue)
Special: Atsushi Yamatoya

10 best films
 Hikinige Family (Toshiyuki Mizutani)
 The Games Teachers Play (Hideyuki Hirayama)
 Pineapple Tours (Tsutomu Makiya, Yuji Nakae, Hayashi Tōma)
 Wangan Bad Boy Blue (Tadafumi Tomioka)
 Kurenai Monogatari (Toshiharu Ikeda)
 Usureyuku Kioku no Nakade (Kazuyuki Shinoda)
 3 Gatsu no Lion (Hitoshi Yasaki)
 Arifureta Ai ni Kansuru Chōsa (Kōji Enokido)
 Gunkan Musashi (Masami Tezuka)
 The Guard from Underground (Kiyoshi Kurosawa)

References

External links
  

Japan Film Professional Awards
1993 in Japanese cinema
Japan Film Professional Awards
March 1993 events in Asia